Sherman Free Library is an historic public library, located in the hamlet of Port Henry, in Essex County, New York.  It was built in 1887 and has two rooms, and is a -story brick building topped by slate-covered, steeply pitched gable roofs, on a limestone foundation.  An addition was built in 1907.  It features deeply arched fenestration in the Richardsonian Romanesque style.

It was listed on the National Register of Historic Places in 1995.

References

Library buildings completed in 1887
Libraries on the National Register of Historic Places in New York (state)
Romanesque Revival architecture in New York (state)
Buildings and structures in Essex County, New York
National Register of Historic Places in Essex County, New York